Chinese clothing includes the traditional hanfu and garments of ethnic minorities, as well as modern variations of indigenous Chinese dresses. Chinese clothing has been shaped through its dynastic traditions, as well as through foreign influences. Chinese clothing showcases the traditional fashion sensibilities of Chinese culture traditions and forms one of the major cultural facets of Chinese civilization.

Imperial China

Traditional Han clothing has a recorded history of more than three millennia until the end of the Ming Dynasty. Most Chinese men wore Chinese black cotton shoes, but wealthy higher-class people would wear tough black leather shoes for formal occasions. Very rich and wealthy men would wear very bright, beautiful silk shoes, sometimes with leather on the inside. Women would wear silk shoes, often with holes in the top for their feet to fit in, with certain wealthy women practicing foot binding wearing coated Lotus shoes as a status symbol until in the early 20th century.

Civil and military officials
Chinese civil or military officials used a variety of codes to show their rank and position. The most recognized is the Mandarin square or rank badge. Another way to show social standing and civil rank was the use of colorful hat knobs fixed on the top of their hats. The specific hat knob on one's hat determined one's rank, as there were twelve types of hat knobs representing the nine distinctive ranks of the civil or military position. Variations existed for Ming Dynasty official headwear. In the Qing Dynasty different patterns of robes represented different ranks.

Qing Dynasty (1644–1912)

The rise of the Manchu Qing dynasty in many ways represented a new era in Chinese clothing, with certain styles required to be worn by all noblemen and officials. Eventually, these styles also became widespread among the commoners. Manchu official headwear differed from the Ming version, but the Qing continued to use the Mandarin square.

Republican era

The abolition of imperial China in 1912 had an immediate effect on dress and customs. The largely Han Chinese population immediately cut off their queues they had been forced to grow in submission to the overthrown Qing dynasty. Sun Yat-sen popularised a new style of men's wear, featuring jacket and trousers instead of the robes worn previously. Adapted from Japanese student wear, this style of dress became known as the Zhongshan suit (Zhongshan being one of Sun Yat-sen's given names in Chinese).

For women, a transformation of the traditional qipao resulted in a slender form-fitting dress with a high cut. This new "cheongsam" contrasted sharply with the traditional qipao but has largely replaced it in modern fashion. In the early republican period, the traditional dudou underbodice was largely abandoned in favor of western-style corsets and bras.

Early People's Republic
Early in the People's Republic, Mao Zedong inspired Chinese fashion with his own variant of the Zhongshan suit, which would be known to the west as Mao suit. Meanwhile, Sun Yat-sen's widow, Soong Ching-ling, popularized the cheongsam as the standard female dress. At the same time, clothing viewed as backwards and unmodern by both the Chinese as well as Westerners, was forbidden.

Around the Destruction of the "Four Olds" period in 1964, almost anything seen as part of Traditional Chinese culture would lead to problems with the Communist Red Guards. Items that attracted dangerous attention if caught in the public included jeans, high heels, Western-style coats, ties, jewelry, cheongsams, and long hair. These items were regarded as symbols of bourgeois lifestyle, which represented wealth. Citizens had to avoid them or suffer serious consequences such as torture or beatings by the guards. A number of these items were thrown into the streets to embarrass the citizens.

Modern fashion
Hong Kong clothing brand Shanghai Tang's design concept is inspired by historical Chinese clothing. It set out to rejuvenate Chinese fashion of the 1920s and 30s, in bright colors and with a modern twist. Other Chinese luxury brands include NE Tiger, Guo Pei, and Laurence Xu.

In the year 2000, dudou-inspired blouses appeared in the summer collections of Versace and Miu Miu, leading to its adoption within China as a revealing form of outerwear.

For the 2012 Hong Kong Sevens tournament, sportswear brand Kukri Sports teamed up with Hong Kong lifestyle retail store G.O.D. to produce merchandising, which included traditional Chinese jackets and Cheongsam-inspired ladies polo shirts.

In recent years, renewed interest in traditional Chinese culture has led to a movement in China advocating for the revival of hanfu.  As more and more Chinese people like and attach importance to hanfu, Hanfu no longer only appears in Chinese drama as in the past.

Gallery

See also 
 Chinese patchwork
 Hanfu
Cheongsam
 National costume
 Qizhuang

References

Further reading

External links 

 Powerhousemuseum